Kalateh-ye Sefid (also Romanized as Kalāteh-ye Sefīd and Kalāteh Sefīd) is a village in Mian Jam Rural District, in the Central District of Torbat-e Jam County, Razavi Khorasan Province, Iran. At the 2006 census, its population was 30, in 8 families.

References 

Populated places in Torbat-e Jam County